CIC Video was a home video distributor, established in 1980, owned by Cinema International Corporation (the forerunner of United International Pictures), and operated in some countries (such as United Kingdom, Australia, Brazil, Japan, France, Germany, Hungary, Italy, Netherlands, Belgium, Spain, Portugal, Mexico, Norway, Sweden, Denmark, Poland, South Korea, Turkey, Argentina, Colombia, Philippines, Chile and Venezuela) by local operators. Outside North America, it distributed films by Universal Pictures (now owned by NBCUniversal/Comcast) and Paramount Pictures (now owned by Paramount Global, which is owned by National Amusements), CIC's partners. DreamWorks films were added to the company output in 1998, as the fledgling studio had a worldwide video distribution deal with Universal.

History 
When the distributor appointed Karl Oliver from Brooke Bond Batchelors to be its sales and marketing director in 1991, they wanted him to introduce "classic FMCG disciplines" to its marketing campaign. Oliver responded by reducing video cassette prices to and promote impulse purchasing as part of CIC Video's reformed distribution strategy. After the sudden death of CIC Video's president Roy Featherstone of an asthma attack on 17 July 1992 the distributor underwent restructuring with aid from senior Universal and Paramount employees. In 1994, Viacom purchased Paramount Pictures, enabling CIC Video to gain international distribution rights to shows from, among other networks, MTV and Nickelodeon, which came into effect in Australia in 1995 and the UK and other countries in early 1996.

In 1999, CIC Video was dissolved when Universal purchased PolyGram Filmed Entertainment and reorganized its video division under the Universal name. Paramount Home Entertainment UK became CIC Video's successor. The last videos with the CIC label were released in the same year. Meanwhile, the distributor signed sales and distribution contracts with local market producers in Europe to increase profit and the brand name of CIC Video remained in the short term in markets where Paramount Home Entertainment were absent.

CIC Video was operated in Australia (where it was known as CIC-Taft Home Video) by the Taft-Hardie joint venture (now Southern Star Group), and also distributed some Southern Star and Hanna-Barbera product under other labels. The Hanna-Barbera library is now handled usually by Warner Home Video. The label's defunct subsidiary was a distributor called Rigby-CIC Video and CIC-Taft's label manufacturer was Roadshow Home Video.

CIC Video was operated in Sweden by Esselte Video.

References 

Home video distributors
Home video companies established in 1980
Home video companies disestablished in 1999
1981 mergers and acquisitions
Universal Pictures
Paramount Pictures